Red Jet 2 was a high speed catamaran passenger ferry operated by Red Funnel between Southampton and Cowes on the Isle of Wight. She was built by FB Marine in 1991. She is identical to her sister ship, Red Jet 1.

Specification
Originally designed to carry 120 passengers, this was increased to 130 in 1993 and to 138 in 1998.

History
She was christened by Lady Mottistone on 6 June 1991, subsequently entering service on 28 June. Her introduction was speeded up in order to compete with the rival Cowes Express service. Her arrival led to the withdrawal of the hydrofoil ferry Shearwater 4.

In 2009, she was withdrawn from service and, along with her sister craft, Red Jet 1, sold to Caspian Mainport for service in the Black Sea. The two craft left Southampton on the La Rochelle bound for Saint Petersburg on 14 May. She was renamed CM Jet 2 and used on Caspian's ferry routes. in 2021 she was repurposed for use as a tender and renamed SA Jet 2.

See also
Red Jet 1
Red Jet 3
Red Jet 4
Red Jet 5
Red Jet 6
Red Jet 7

References

Ferries of England
Ferry transport on the Isle of Wight
1991 ships
Individual catamarans
Ships of Red Funnel